No Time for Sergeants is a 1958 American comedy film based on a play by Ira Levin inspired by the original novel. It was directed by Mervyn LeRoy, starring Andy Griffith and featuring Myron McCormick, Don Knotts and most of the original Broadway cast, joined by Warner Bros. contract player Nick Adams and Murray Hamilton.

Plot 
Will Stockdale (Griffith) is a backwoods rube from Georgia, with super strength and a weak mind, who is drafted into the United States Air Force. Other draftees being transported to basic training include the dim Ben Whitledge (Nick Adams) and obnoxious bully Irving S. Blanchard (Murray Hamilton). The unhappy Whitledge wants to be assigned to the infantry where his six brothers served.

At boot camp, Stockdale proceeds to make life miserable for the man in charge, Master Sergeant Orville C. King (Myron McCormick), a career hack who likes his barracks to be routine, quiet and calm. In exasperation, the sergeant places Stockdale on full-time latrine duty. Stockdale believes his new position of "P.L.O." (Permanent Latrine Orderly) to be a promotion. A company inspection takes a surprising turn when Stockdale's immaculately clean latrine impresses King's company commander. King gets into hot water, however, when Stockdale reveals that the sergeant kept him on permanent bathroom duty while neglecting to have the recruit complete all the required military exams. The company commander orders King to help Stockdale through his training in one week, or else he will be demoted and made "P. L. O." himself.

Rushing him through testing, King bribes Stockdale by promising to give him his wristwatch if he can pass. Stockdale takes a manual dexterity test from Corporal John C. Brown (Don Knotts), a psychiatric test from Maj. Royal B. Demming (James Millhollin), and an eye exam. Stockdale manages to pass despite driving all of the examiners crazy and gets the wristwatch as a reward.
 
Blanchard convinces King to get Stockdale drunk so that he will fail the next day's inspection.  Stockdale, used to strong homemade moonshine, stays sober while King and Blanchard get drunk.  They begin a barroom brawl with equally drunk infantrymen, but Stockdale leaves and returns to the base, avoiding the M.P.s. Blanchard is arrested and King is missing when the colonel and captain inspect the latrine and barracks the next day. Stockdale has mechanically rigged all the toilet seats to open simultaneously in a "salute". A filthy King is found after he sneaks into the latrine and sets off the toilet lids. He is summarily reduced to private rank and sent to gunnery school along with Stockdale and Whitledge. As King goes back to his office dejected, he admits to Stockdale that he has grown to like him. Stockdale gives the watch back to King.

At gunnery school, Stockdale is at the bottom of the class and Whitledge is next to the bottom. King graduates as the top man and is assigned to the staff of General Eugene Bush (Howard Smith) at his former rank. On their first flight, Stockdale and Whitledge fly to Denver in an obsolete B-25 bomber. Stockdale's assignment is tail gunner. After putting the plane on autopilot, the pilots fall asleep, and the airplane becomes lost at night over the atomic bomb test site at Yucca Flats, Nevada.  The radio operator was left behind at the base, so Stockdale and Whitledge must radio to obtain their position.  Military radiomen on the ground, confused by Stockdale's folksy, clownish speech, have the commander of the atomic bomb test rouse General Bush to confirm that Stockdale is not a prankster. Bush reassures Stockdale that he is not a foreign agent, as King tells Bush to remind Stockdale of the watch.

Following detonation of an atom bomb, a fire breaks out in the aft of the plane. Stockdale and Whitledge bail out and travel for days to get back to the base.  They are declared dead by King, but the officers survive and are to be decorated. During the air medal ceremony, Stockdale and Whitledge reappear, so the Air Force has to cover up the story to avoid an international public humiliation. Stockdale suggests both he and Whitledge be transferred to the infantry.  General Bush heartily approves and has King transferred with them.

Cast 

 Andy Griffith as Pvt. Will Stockdale
 Myron McCormick as M/Sgt. Orville C. King
 Nick Adams as Pvt. Benjamin B. Whitledge
 Murray Hamilton as Irving S. Blanchard
 Howard Smith as Maj. Gen. Eugene Bush, U.S. Air Force
 Will Hutchins as Lt. George Bridges  (B-25 pilot)
 Sydney Smith as Maj. Gen. Vernon Pollard, U.S. Army
 James Millhollin as Maj. Royal B. Demming (psychiatrist)

 Don Knotts as Cpl. John C. Brown (dexterity tester)
 Jean Willes as WAF Captain
 Bartlett Robinson as Captain
 Henry McCann as Lt. Cover
 Dub Taylor as McKinney (draft board man)
 William Fawcett as Pa Stockdale
 Raymond Bailey as Base Colonel
 Jamie Farr as Lt. Gardella B-25 (co-pilot)
 Will Hutchins as a Pilot

Reception 
The film was a major hit, and was largely responsible for launching the careers of Griffith, Adams and Knotts.

Comic book adaptation
 Dell Four Color #914 (July 1958)

See also
 List of American films of 1958

References

External links 
 
 
 

1958 films
1958 comedy films
American comedy films
American aviation films
American black-and-white films
Films based on American novels
American films based on plays
Films based on works by Ira Levin
Films directed by Mervyn LeRoy
Military humor in film
Films about the United States Air Force
Warner Bros. films
Films based on adaptations
Films adapted into comics
1950s English-language films
1950s American films